The Church Of St Andrew in Wiveliscombe, Somerset, England was built in 1829. It is a Grade II* listed building.

History

The church was built by Richard Carver between 1827 and 1829, on the site of an earlier medieval church. It originally had a gallery but this is now the organ loft. The Rose window was added in 1915.

The parish is part of the Wiveliscombe and the Hills benefice, within the Diocese of Bath and Wells.

Architecture

The red sandstone building has hamstone dressings and a slate roof. The aisle is of five bays. The three-stage tower is at the western end of the church.

Inside the church are a 14th-century font from the earlier church along with the tombs of Humphrey Wyndham and his wife who died in the early 17th century.

The churchyard cross was erected in the 14th century. It has an octagonal base and tapering shaft. The head of the cross is missing.

See also  
 List of ecclesiastical parishes in the Diocese of Bath and Wells

References

Grade II* listed buildings in Taunton Deane
Grade II* listed churches in Somerset
Wiveliscombe